Milton is a neighborhood of Kansas City, Missouri, United States.

Milton has the name of the local Milton family, original owners of the land where the community now stands.

References

Neighborhoods in Kansas City, Missouri